Minoa is the name of bronze-age settlements in the Mediterranean coasts:

Minoa may also refer to:

Cities
 Minoa (Amorgos), a town of ancient Amorgos, Greece
 Minoa (eastern Crete), a city of ancient Crete, Greece
 Minoa (western Crete), a town of ancient Crete, Greece
 Minoa (Paros), a town of ancient Paros, Greece
 Minoa (Siphnos), a town of ancient Siphnos, Greece
 Heraclea Minoa, an ancient town in Sicily
 Minoa, New York, a village in New York, United States
Biology
 Minoa (moth), a genus of moth
Other uses
 Minoa, ancient name of Paros, an island of Greece
 Minoan civilization
 East Syracuse-Minoa Central High School
 East Syracuse-Minoa Central School District